Hanne Haugland (born 14 December 1967 in Haugesund) is a former Norwegian high jumper. She represented the clubs Haugesund IL, IL i BUL, SK Vidar and IF Minerva during her senior career.

In her early international career she finished eleventh at the 1987 European Indoor Championships and the 1989 World Indoor Championships and thirteenth at the 1988 European Indoor Championships. Her first international medal came at the 1989 European Indoor Championships where she won a silver with a jump of 1.96 metres.

She then finished fourth at the 1990 European Indoor Championships, eighth at the 1990 European Championships, twelfth at the 1991 World Indoor Championships and the 1992 European Indoor Championships, ninth at the 1993 World Championships, sixth at the 1994 European Indoor Championships, fifth at the 1994 European Championships ninth at the 1995 World Indoor Championships, sixth at the 1995 World Championships and eighth at the 1996 Summer Olympics.

In 1997 she won the bronze medal at the World Indoor Championships with 2.00 metres and the gold medal at the World Championships with 1.99 metres. Her personal best jump of 2.01 metres was achieved in August 1997 at the Weltklasse Zürich meet. This is the current Norwegian record. Furthermore, she cleared 1.95 metres or more 21 times.

She became Norwegian high jump champion in the years 1986-1987, 1989–1990, 1992–1997 and 1999-2000. In addition she took the national title in long jump in 1989, 1990 and 1995 and triple jump in 1994.

Haugland went on to coach several Norwegian high jumpers, including Anne Gerd Eieland. She is married to fellow former high jumper Håkon Särnblom. Her grandfather Eugen Haugland and father Terje Haugland competed in international athletics as well.

Achievements

Notes: Results with a Q, indicate overall position in qualifying round.

References

External links

1967 births
Living people
Norwegian female high jumpers
Athletes (track and field) at the 1996 Summer Olympics
Athletes (track and field) at the 2000 Summer Olympics
Olympic athletes of Norway
World Athletics Championships medalists
World Athletics Championships winners